Michael Stern (born December 17, 1959) is an American symphony conductor. Currently, he serves as the music director and lead conductor of the Kansas City Symphony in Kansas City, Missouri. In 2019, he was also named the fourth music director of the Stamford Symphony in Stamford, Connecticut [now known at Orchestra LUMOS]. He is also the founding music director of the IRIS Orchestra in Germantown, Tennessee. In 2021, Stern was appointed as Music Director of the National Repertory Orchestra in Breckenridge, CO.  He is only the third Music Director in the organization's history.

Early life and education
Stern is the son of violinist Isaac Stern. He obtained his undergraduate degree in American history from Harvard College in 1981.  Subsequently, he studied under conductor Max Rudolf at the Curtis Institute of Music in Philadelphia, graduating in 1986.  Stern also studied for one summer at the Los Angeles Philharmonic Institute and for two summers at the Pierre Monteux Memorial School in Hancock, Maine.

Career
In May 1986, only weeks before his graduation from the Curtis Institute, Stern auditioned for and won the job of conducting assistant at The Cleveland Orchestra, where the music director was Christoph von Dohnányi. The audition and the position were both organized under the aegis of the Exxon/Arts Endowment Conductor's Program. Stern officially was named a full assistant conductor the following season, and stayed with the orchestra until 1991. In September 1986, he debuted at the New York Philharmonic as one of three young conductors whom Leonard Bernstein invited to participate in a conducting workshop which culminated in two concerts at Avery Fisher Hall.

That year, Stern became the permanent guest conductor of the Orchestre National de Lyon in Lyon, France. During his four years with the Orchestre National, he also appeared with orchestras in Paris, Bordeaux, Lille, and Toulouse, as well as others throughout Europe.

In 1996, he left the Orchestre National to become chief conductor of the Saarbrücken Radio Symphony Orchestra, a prominent recording and broadcast orchestra in Germany, making him the first American to hold the position of chief conductor in that orchestra's history. His work there is also notable for the orchestra's many recordings of American classical music during his tenure, including discs of works by Henry Cowell and Charles Ives. He also led the orchestra on tours of Spain, Portugal, China and Switzerland.  He stepped down as chief conductor in 2000.

After leaving the Saarbrücken Radio Symphony Orchestra, Stern founded the IRIS Orchestra in Germantown, Tennessee, which specializes in playing American contemporary music.  Beyond his work with IRIS, he frequently appeared throughout North America as a guest conductor of many symphony orchestras, including a series of concerts at the New York Philharmonic in the summer of 2001, the Chicago Symphony Orchestra, the Philadelphia Orchestra, the Pittsburgh Symphony, the Saint Louis Symphony Orchestra, the Atlanta Symphony, the Houston Symphony, the Baltimore Symphony, the Toronto Symphony, Ottawa's National Arts Centre Orchestra, the Cincinnati Symphony Orchestra, the Montreal Symphony Orchestra, the Indianapolis Symphony Orchestra, and Washington, D.C.'s National Symphony Orchestra. He also began regular appearances at the Aspen Music Festival. In September 2001, Stern led the Vienna Radio Symphony on a tour of China.

During this time, Stern also continued guest conducting orchestras worldwide, including the Royal Stockholm Philharmonic, the Oslo Philharmonic, the Bergen Symphony, Bonn's Beethovenhalle Orchestra, Berlin's Deutsche Symphoniker, the Budapest Radio Symphony Orchestra, the Israel Philharmonic, the Moscow Philharmonic, the Helsinki Philharmonic, Rome's Orchestra dell'Accademia Nazionale di Santa Cecilia, Munich's Bavarian Radio Symphony Orchestra, Lausanne's Chamber Orchestra, Zurich's Tonhalle Orchestra, the London Symphony Orchestra, the London Philharmonic Orchestra, the BBC Symphony Orchestra, the English Chamber Orchestra, the National Symphony of Taiwan, the Singapore Symphony, and the NHK Symphony Orchestra.

On September 30, 2005, Stern accepted an appointment as music director and lead conductor of the Kansas City Symphony, a position he currently holds. He also continues his guest conducting travels and his work with the IRIS Orchestra.

In March 2014, Michael Stern made history with The Kansas City Symphony and Engage Mobile Solutions when they used four pair of Google Glass at the same time to record a performance of Beethoven's 5th Symphony.

References

External links
 Michael Stern recordings
 Michael Stern at the Kansas City Symphony
 Michael Stern at Naxos Records
 Michael Stern at Colbert Artists Management

1959 births
American male conductors (music)
Living people
Harvard College alumni
People from the Kansas City metropolitan area
Curtis Institute of Music alumni
People from Germantown, Tennessee
Classical musicians from Missouri
21st-century American conductors (music)
21st-century American male musicians